Athahatha village, Zamania, Ghazipur, Uttar Pradesh, India was established in 1799.

External links
Google maps accessed 24 January 2017
Brand Bharat, accessed 24 January 2017
Village Info, accessed 24 January 2017

Villages in Ghazipur district